Nu Aurigae, Latinised from ν Aurigae, is the Bayer designation for a star in the northern constellation of Auriga. It is visible to the naked eye with an apparent visual magnitude of 3.96 and is approximately  distant from the Earth. This is an evolved giant star with a stellar classification of G9.5 III. It is a red clump star, which indicates that it is generating energy through the fusion of helium at its core. It shines with 135 times the luminosity of the Sun.

This is an astrometric binary with a suspected white dwarf companion. A 10th-magnitude star 54.6 arcseconds away is an optical companion.

References

External links
 HR 2012
 CCDM J05515+3909
 Image Nu Aurigae

G-type giants
Horizontal-branch stars
Astrometric binaries
Auriga (constellation)
Aurigae, Nu
Durchmusterung objects
Aurigae, 32
039003
027673
2012